A light tank is a tank variant initially designed for rapid movements in and out of combat, to outmaneuver heavier tanks. It is smaller in size with thinner armor and a less powerful main gun, tailored for better tactical mobility and ease of transport and logistics. They are primarily employed in the screening, armored reconnaissance, skirmishing, artillery observation, and supplementing landing operations in a fire support role of expeditionary forces where larger, heavier tanks are unavailable or have difficulties operating safely or efficiently.

The fast light tank was a major feature of the pre–World War II army buildup, where it was expected they would be used to exploit breakthroughs in enemy lines created by slower, heavier tanks, with the goal of disrupting communications and supply lines. Numerous small tank designs and "tankettes" were developed during this period and known under a variety of names, including the "combat car".

Early light tank designs were generally better armed and armored than armored cars, but used tracks in order to provide better cross-country mobility. The light tank has been one of the few tank variants to survive the development of the main battle tank—in which technological advancements have rendered all previous weight variants obsolete—and has seen use in a variety of roles including the support of light airborne or amphibious forces and reconnaissance. Modified IFVs are assuming these roles in many militaries due to their immediate availability, and as a cheaper versatile alternative to developing and fielding a pure light tank.

History

20th century

World War I

In World War I, industrial initiative also led to swift advances. The car industry, already used to vehicle mass production and having much more experience in vehicle layout, designed the first practical light tanks in 1916, a class largely neglected by the British. Renault's small tank design, the FT, was the first tank to incorporate a top-mounted turret with a full rotation. The FT was in many respects the first truly modern tank having a layout that has been followed by almost all designs ever since: driver at the front; main armament in a fully rotating turret on top; engine at the rear. Previous models had been "box tanks", with a single crowded space combining the role of engine room, fighting compartment, ammunition stock and driver's cabin. The FT had the largest production run of any tank of the war, over 3,700 (mostly in 1918), and was more numerous than all British and German tanks combined.

Interwar

The Carden Loyd tankette and its derivatives were adopted by several nations as small tracked vehicles carrying a machine gun for armament. At a time of limited military budgets, tankettes were relatively cheap and functioned as reconnaissance vehicles and mobile machine gun posts. In 1928, the British firm of Vickers-Armstrong started promoting another design by John Carden and Vivien Loyd as the "six-ton tank". Although rejected by the British Army, it was bought by a large number of nations in small numbers. It formed the basis of the Soviet T-26 (around 10,000 built) and the Polish 7TP tank and influenced the Italian Fiat M11/39. The British Army did not use the design as a light tank themselves but a developed version of the Carden Loyd tankette as the starting point for a series of British light tanks intended for use in imperial policing and expeditionary warfare. As the only tank fit for immediate manufacture, it was a key element in the expansion of the British Army in the period leading up to the outbreak of war.

In general, French tanks of the 1930s were well-armored, innovative vehicles that owed little to foreign designs. However, the light tanks lacked firepower and almost all French tanks were handicapped by their one-man turrets, even the larger tanks such as the Char B1, which overworked the commander who, besides directing the vehicle, or even a troop, had to load and aim the turret gun. The lack of radios with the light tanks was not seen as a major drawback, since French doctrine called for slow-paced, deliberate maneuvers in close conformance to plans. The role of small unit leaders was to execute plans, not to take the initiative in combat. In 1939, a belated effort was made to improve flexibility and increase the number of radios.

Throughout the interwar period the US produced only a few hundred tanks. From the end of World War I to 1935, only 15 tanks were produced. Most were derivatives or foreign designs or very poor quality private designs. The Christie designs were among the few better examples, but the US Army acquired only three Christies and did not pursue the idea any further. Budget limitations and the low priority given to the army meant that there were few resources for building tanks. The US Army instead developed and tested tank components such as suspensions, tracks, and transmissions. This paid off when production had to be initiated on the outbreak of war.

World War II

At the start of World War II, the majority of all of the great powers' tank forces consisted of light designs. The most common were the British Light Tank Mk VI, French Renault R35, German Panzer I, Italian L3/35 (classified as a light tank by the Royal Italian Army, a tankette by others), Japanese Type 95 Ha-Go light tank, Soviet T-26, and American M2 light tank.

Soviet
The Soviet BT tanks were the most advanced in the 1930s, extremely fast and mounting high velocity 45 mm cannons. Their only drawback were their petrol engines which caught fire often and easily during the Nomonhan fighting, which lasted from about May through September 1939. The Japanese Type 95 Ha-Go light tank was equipped with a diesel engine, and although mounting a 37 mm cannon, it was a low velocity gun with a maximum effective range of about 700 meters. However, this conflict would be instrumental in developing the famous T-34 medium tank.

Germany
Germany's armored Panzer force was not especially impressive at the start of the war. In the invasions of Poland and France, the German forces were mostly made up of the Panzer I and Panzer II light tanks. The Panzer I was little more than a training vehicle armed only with machine guns, the Panzer II with a 20 mm cannon. The Panzer division also included some Czech designed light tanks—the Panzer 35(t) and the Panzer 38(t).

American
American light tank development started with the M2 light tank series. These light tanks were mechanically very reliable, with good mobility. However, they had a high silhouette, and only a few saw combat. The M3 Stuart series was an improvement of the M2 with better armor. The new medium tank just entering production in 1940 was the M2A1. This was a poor design with thin armor and a high silhouette.

The M3 Stuart saw use in the North African Campaign but was relegated to reconnaissance as soon as US-built medium tanks became available. Further light tank development in the war led to the improved M5 Stuart and then included the M24 Chaffee.

Light tanks were issued to tank battalions (one of the four companies was a light tank company), light tank battalions and cavalry reconnaissance squadrons. The original role of the light tank in these formations was similar to medium tanks and they were expected to engage enemy armor with AP rounds and enemy positions with HE rounds. As a result, tank gunnery training for light and medium tankers was common.

US Army Field Manuals written before 1944 clearly show that light tanks were to be part of an armored assault on enemy positions, and examples of fire on enemy armor were in these manuals. When pursuing an enemy, Light Tank Battalions were expected to move parallel with enemy columns and, together with accompanying infantry and engineer units, seize "critical terrain that will block hostile retreat". Despite the fact that light tank platoons were not expected to function as a reconnaissance unit, they could be used for reconnaissance purposes. In this role, they were expected to remain behind the main reconnaissance force as the support element and augment the firepower whenever enemy contact was made.

British
The British withdrew their light tank designs from their armored divisions early in the war, but used some later designs for minor amphibious operations and airborne operations. In general they used armored cars for reconnaissance and the last of the light tank designs, the light tank Mk VIII "Harry Hopkins", was produced only in small numbers.

Japan
The Japanese made extensive use of light tanks that were much better suited to jungle warfare than larger designs, such as the Type 95 Ha-Go light tank.

Cold War

Light tanks continued to be built, but for very limited roles such as amphibious reconnaissance, support of airborne units, and in rapid-intervention forces that were not expected to face enemy tanks. The Soviet PT-76 is a specialized light tank –amphibious with sufficient firepower to engage other reconnaissance vehicles, but very lightly armored. The US fielded small numbers of the M41 Walker Bulldog with a high velocity 76mm gun, and better armor, but it suffered from range limits, and its weight was too heavy for most air transport of the day. The US M551 Sheridan had similar strengths and weaknesses, but could also be airdropped, either by parachute or LAPES. The French had their AMX-13 light tank, which was designed for its capability to be quickly air-dropped for use with paratroopers and also able to support lightly armed infantry and perform force-reconnaissance effectively.

The British FV101 Scorpion, the fire support variant of the Combat Vehicle Reconnaissance (Tracked) series of vehicles that replaced armored cars in British service, has been described as a light tank and was sold to many smaller nations. Another light tank in the Cold War era was the Swedish Ikv 91 armored vehicle. It had a low-pressure 90mm gun, strong armor against 20mm grenades, and it was fully amphibious.

Post–Cold War

Light tanks, such as the PT-76, continue to play a small role in tank warfare, although many are losing favor to cheaper, faster, and lighter armored cars. The light tank still fills an important niche in many armies, especially for nations with airborne divisions, Marine Infantry, or those without the resources and funding for main battle tanks. They have important advantages over heavier tanks in Southeast Asia and other nations in the Equatorial region. Their compact dimensions and short-to-nonexistent barrel overhang lets them maneuver through thick rain forests, and their weight reduces the risk of getting stuck in mud, and simplifies recovery of stuck or damaged tanks. This makes the light tank the preferred choice for infantry support in Equatorial nations. Post–Cold War light tanks include the Stingray, ZTQ-15, M8 Armored Gun System, Kaplan MT / Harimau, and General Dynamics Griffin II. Light tanks based on infantry fighting vehicles chassis include the CV90105T, 2S25 Sprut-SD, Tanque Argentino Mediano, ASCOD LT 105, and Sabrah.

21st century light tank design

Role
The modern light tank supplements the main battle tank in expeditionary roles and situations where all major threats have been neutralized and excessive weight in armor and armament would only hinder mobility and cost more money to operate. They have also been used for reconnaissance and, in some cases, infantry support.

Countermeasures
Typically, the armor in contemporary light tanks is modular, sometimes up to three configurations.

The flat hull necessary for amphibious light tanks to plane across the surface of the water is not nearly as blast-resistant as the V-shaped hull. It has been suggested that underbelly armor appliqué could be applied after the light tanks come ashore and before they encounter explosive devices.

Weapons

A gun capable of defeating modern tanks at reasonable ranges requires a large vehicle to carry it. Gun weight is typically the product of caliber and muzzle velocity. Large caliber guns on light tanks often sacrifice muzzle velocity in interest of saving weight. These guns are effective against close-quarter targets but lack the power and/or accuracy to effectively engage heavier vehicles at a distance.

Mobility

Tactical mobility

Some light tanks such as the PT-76 are amphibious, typically being propelled in the water by hydrojets or by their tracks. Most amphibious light tanks weigh little and often utilize aluminum armor. Some light tanks require no modifications for river crossings. Crews simply raise the easily accessible cloth sides around the hull, cover the hatches, turn on the bilge pump and shift the transmission to water operations. Often, a fold down trim vane is erected to stop water from flooding into the hatch.

Strategic mobility

Some light tanks, such as the M551 Sheridan, ZTQ-15 and 2S25 Sprut-SD armored reconnaissance vehicle, could be rigged for low-velocity airdrops from cargo aircraft. With this method the tank is pulled out of the aircraft by brake chutes and skids to a stop. The crew does not ride in the tank during extraction, but parachutes from another plane. Upon landing, they go to their tank, release the lines, and drive it away.

See also
 Main battle tank
 Tankette
 Light tanks of the United Kingdom
 History of the tank
 Tanks in World War I
 Comparison of World War I tanks
 Tanks of the interwar period
 Tanks in World War II
 Comparison of early World War II tanks
 Cold War Tanks
 Post-Cold War Tanks
 Armoured fighting vehicle

Notes

References

Bibliography
 
 
 Coox, Alvin D. Nomonhan; Japan Against Russia, 1939. Two volumes, 1985. Stanford University Press. .
 
 
 
 
 
 
 
 
 Zaloga, Steven. Japanese Tanks 1939-45. Osprey 2007. .

External links

 Tank Museum:Light Tank Category 

 
Tanks by type